Edward Ronald Weismiller (August 3, 1915 Monticello, Wisconsin - August 25, 2010 Washington, D.C.) was an American poet, scholar and professor of English, George Washington University. .

Life
He was raised in Wisconsin and Vermont. In 1936, the twenty-year-old Edward Weismiller became the youngest poet to win the prestigious Yale Series of Younger Poets prize.

He graduated from Cornell College in 1938, from Harvard University with a master’s in 1942, and from Oxford University, with a D.Phil. in 1950, where he was a Rhodes scholar.

Professor Weismiller, an eminent scholar of John Milton’s poetry, came to
Washington, DC in 1968 to study original source materials in the Folger
Library, and stayed on to teach in the English department of the George
Washington University. After his retirement in 1980 he remained there,
reveling in the city’s beauty, variety, and cultural ferment. He was in
love with words and stories and had a gift for making and keeping friends.
An inspiring teacher, he worked to instill the love of beautiful and
precise language in his students, and many of them went on to success as
writers, artists, actors, teachers.

Weismiller was proud of what he called a nice American success story. His
father, Jacob Weismiller, came of German-Swiss stock; his mother, Georgia
Wilson, was of Scottish descent. Young Edward grew up inventing word games
and creating crossword puzzles for his sister Jean. The family lived on a
tiny farm in rural Wisconsin and the children went to a small country
school where Edward won good grades from his teachers and attacks from a
bully. His mother died when he was 11, shattering the family. Two years
later, taken in by his older sister Luverne, he began doing better in high
school and writing songs and poetry. Gently guided by his brother-in-law,
paper chemist  Westbrook Steele, he won scholarships to Swarthmore and then
to Cornell College in Iowa,  where he fell in love with Milton’s poetry and
began to publish his own. At age  20 he became the youngest Yale Younger
Poet when his first book of poems, The Deer Come Down, was selected for
publication by series editor Stephen Vincent Benet.

In 1936 he was awarded a Rhodes Scholarship to Oxford, soon interrupted
when England and Germany declared war. Repatriated with the other U.S.
students, he earned his master's degree and taught at Harvard, where he
founded lifelong friendships with some of the best poets and writers of his
generation. A sojourn at Yaddo nourished his talent. He also met and
married Frances Merewether Power of Redlands, California, a budding poet
and journalist; their first child was born in 1942. He translated
a prize-winning French novel, The Young Concubine, and began his second
book of poems, The Faultless Shore, published after the war, in 1946.

When the U.S. joined the European war, Weismiller’s life took an
astonishing  twist. In a midnight phone call from the new Office of
Strategic Services (OSS),  he was recruited for counterespionage. (He never
knew who had recommended him.) He chose to earn his required commission and
startle his friends—and the Commandant—by joining the Marine Corps. On
detached service in Europe, he was trained by the British secret services
MI5 and MI6 and watched the terrible beauty of firebombs falling on the
roofs of London. Deployed to Cherbourg, France, after D-Day, he became the
first American officer to run a captured enemy agent back against the
Germans. Eventually he was put in charge of counterespionage in the
American Zone in  occupied Germany. He was awarded a  Bronze Star and the
Médaille de la Reconnaissance française. When he turned in his final
report, he was told that it was so highly classified that he would never
see it again. (He later heard that the British, apparently less secretive,
were using their copy in counterespionage training.)

After the war Weismiller declined an invitation to join the newly formed
CIA, which succeeded the OSS; instead he went home to his family in
Southern California and commenced work on his novel, The Serpent Sleeping,
sustained by a Guggenheim writing fellowship. In 1948 the Rhodes Trust
invited back the scholars whose time had been cut short by the war,
allowing them to bring their new families, so he earned his doctorate from
Oxford. He went on to teach poetry, creative writing, and Milton at Pomona
College. Over the years four more children were born.

In 1968, now divorced, he came to Washington and began a new phase of life.
His third book of poems, The Branch of Fire, was published in 1970, and he
was invited to give a reading of his poems at the Library of Congress in
1979. After retiring in 1980 he continued to write and reap honors. He
contributed to the Princeton Encyclopedia of Poetry, was an editor of the
Variorum Milton series (a compendium of the best modern scholarship), and
received the 2001 Robert Fitzgerald Award for lifetime contribution to the
study of metrics and versification. In 2002, at age 87, he became the
oldest Yale Younger Poet when the press published Walking Toward the Sun,
with a foreword by W. S. Merwin (then U.S. poet laureate).

Weismiller always saw himself as a citizen soldier, not professional
military, but his service affected him deeply. The war’s ambience and human
lessons permeated his 1962 novel, The Serpent Sleeping, recently
republished in a British series of classic spy novels. FOIA requests by
historian Tim Naftali got his final OSS report declassified, setting off a
much-enjoyed series of interviews with historians and popular writers on
what his war was really like. Weismiller had been one of the few Marines
stationed in Europe; most were in the South Pacific. His unusual situation
eventually yielded a bonus: a White House invitation to attend the 50th
anniversary celebrations of V.E. Day, traveling to England, France, Prague,
and all the way to Russia in a special tour with distinguished veterans
from all the services, then-Vice President Gore, and then-Secretary of the
Army Togo West.

His work has appeared in Kenyon Review and The Atlantic.

In 1941, Random House hired Weismiller, then a 26-year-old student, to translate the first award-winning novel of Franco-Khmer poet Makhali-Phal into English. La Favorite de dix ans was published in New York in 1942 as The Young Concubine. In 2008, Professor Weismiller began advising a literary team working to produce an updated version of his original translation incorporating cultural background material unavailable in 1941.

He lived in Washington, D.C. until his death on August 25, 2010, at 95.

Awards
 2001 Robert Fitzgerald Prosody Award
 1936 Yale Series of Younger Poets Competition
 1943 Guggenheim Fellowship
 Rockefeller Foundation grant
 National Endowment for the Humanities grant

Works
"Poem", Slate,  August 25, 1999
"Letter Found Blown Against a Fence", Slate,  June 30, 1999
 The Deer Come Down, Yale University Press, 1936
 The Young Concubine, Random House, 1942 (As translator of La favorite de dix ans by Makhali-Phal)
 The Faultless Shore, Houghton Mifflin Co., 1946

Novels

Anthologies

 Poets of World War II, Harvey Shapiro (ed.) "To the Woman in Bond Street Station",

References

American male poets
1915 births
2010 deaths
People from Monticello, Green County, Wisconsin
George Washington University faculty
Cornell College alumni
Harvard University alumni
Alumni of Merton College, Oxford
Poets from Vermont
Poets from Wisconsin
American Rhodes Scholars
Yale Younger Poets winners
20th-century American poets
World War II spies for the United States
20th-century American male writers